The Nupe (traditionally called the Nupawa by the Hausas and Tapa by the neighbouring Yoruba) are an ethnic group native to the Middle Belt of Nigeria. They are the dominant ethnic group in Niger State and a minority in Kwara State. The Nupe are also present in Kogi State and The Federal Capital Territory.

History
The Nupe trace their origin to Tsoede who fled the court of Idah and established a loose confederation of towns along the Niger in the 15th century.  The proximity of Nupe to the Yoruba Igbomina people in the south and to the Yoruba Oyo people in the southwest led to cross-fertilization of cultural influences through trade and conflicts over the centuries.

Population and demography
There are probably about 4.5 million Nupes, principally in Niger State. The Nupe language is also spoken in Kwara, Kogi and Federal Capital Territory. They are primarily Muslims, with some Christians and followers of African Traditional Religion. The nupe people have several local traditional rulers. The Etsu Nupe (Bida) is not pure nupe, his great grandfather from his father side is  Fulani while the family of his mother was complete nupe. His great grandfather from his father side came to rule Bida in the 1806. They have no present capital, although they were originally based at Rabah and only moved to Bida in the nineteenth century.

Traditions, art and culture
The Nupe people have various traditions. Many practices  have changed as a result of the movements started by  Usman Dan Fodio jihad of the 19th century, but they still hold on to some of their culture. Many Nupe people often have tribal marks on their faces (similar to an old Igala tradition), some to identify their prestige and the family of which they belong as well as for protection, as well as jewellery adornment. But these traditions are dying out in certain areas.

Their art is often abstract. They are well known for their wooden stools with patterns carved onto the surface.

The Nupe were described in detail by the ethnographer Siegfried Nadel, whose book, Black Byzantium, remains an anthropological classic.

Examples of Nupe art

Music and Entertainment Industry

Nupe traditional music is sung by the Ningba, or musician(s), while the Enyanicizhi beats the drum. Legendary Nupe singers of memory include people like Hajiya Fatima Lolo Alhaji Nda'asabe, Hajiya Nnadzwa, Hauwa Kulu, Baba-Mini, Ahmed Shata and Ndako Kutigi.

The prime-movers of the Nupe cinema started film-making since the late nineties into the early 2000s. Great Nupe personalities that birthed the idea of producing, acting and directing Nupe dramas/comedies on-screen are Late Sadisu Muhammad DGN, Prince Ahmed Chado, Late Prince Hussaini Kodo, M.B. Yahaya Babs and Jibril Bala Jibril. They are the people who made the move for Nupe dramas to be on-screen and are the founders of the modern-day Nupe Film Industry  known as Nupewood. Nupewood has since produced more than a thousand entertaining movies in Nupe space to the millions of Nupe audiences.

Notable Nupe people 
 Shaikh Ahmad Lemu (OON, OFR), Islamic Scholar (1929–2020)
Hon. Justice Idris Legbo Kutigi (OFR, GCON), Nigeria Lawyer and Judge (1939–2018)
Mohammed Umar Bago, politician (born 1974)
 Muhammad Bima Enagi, politician (born 1959)
 Muhammad Umaru Ndagi, academic professor (born 1964) 
 Shehu Ahmadu Musa, politician (1935–2008)
 Shaaba Lafiaji, politician
 Suleiman Takuma, journalist and political leader (1934–2001)
 Sam Nda-Isaiah, political columnist (1962–2020)
 Isa Mohammed Bagudu, third republic politician (born 1948)
 Zainab Kure, politician (born 1959)
 Abdulkadir Kure, politician (1956–2017)
 Aliyu Makama, Northern acting premiere (1905–1980)
H.R.H. Alhaji Yahaya Abubakar (GCFR), Etsu-Nupe; Traditional ruler (born 1952)
Fatima Lolo, musician (1891–1997)

References

Sources

Blench, R.M. (1984) "Islam among the Nupe." Muslim peoples. (ed. 2) Westview Press, Boulder, Colorado.
Forde, D. (1955) The Nupe. pp. 17–52 in Peoples of the Niger-Benue Confluence. IAI, London.
Ibrahim, Saidu 1992. The Nupe and their neighbours from the 14th century. Ibadan: Heinemann Educational books.
Madugu, George I. (1971) The a construction in Nupe: Perfective, Stative, Causative or Instrumental. In Kim C-W. & Stahlke H. Papers in African Linguistics, I' pp. 81–100. Linguistic Research Institute, Champaign.
Perani, J.M. (1977) Nupe crafts; the dynamics of change in nineteenth and twentieth century weaving and brassworking. Ph.D. Fine Arts, Indiana University.
Stevens, P. (1966) Nupe woodcarving. Nigeria, 88:21-35.
 The Nupe People of Nigeria by Mohammed Kuta Yahaya. Nigeria, 95:1-2

Ethnic groups in Nigeria
Muslim communities in Africa
 

lt:Nupė
ru:Нупе